Ioannis Toumbas (24 February 1901 – 7 May 1995) was a Greek naval officer and politician, best known for his command of the destroyer Adrias during World War II. He also served in several ministerial positions in the 1960s and became a member and chairman of the Academy of Athens.

Military career 
He was born in Mykonos in 1901, and graduated from the Hellenic Naval Academy in 1921. Due to his participation in the Venizelist coup d'état attempt in March 1935, he was dismissed from the service, but was recalled on the outbreak of the Greco-Italian War in October 1940. He served as commander of the Karaburun Naval Fort until the German invasion of Greece in April 1941. Fleeing to the Middle East, he continued to serve in the exiled Greek Armed forces, assuming command of the destroyer  in 1941–1942.

On 20 July 1942, he assumed command of the Adrias, a Hunt-class destroyer, at Newcastle, United Kingdom. With her, he undertook convoy escort duties in the Mediterranean Sea from January 1943, during which the ship sunk two German U-boats. Adrias also covered the Sicily landings in July, and on 10 September she represented Greece in the Allied flotilla that accepted the surrender of the Italian Navy's battle-fleet. Toumbas' finest hour came on 22 October 1943, during the naval operations of the Dodecanese Campaign, when Adrias struck a sea mine and lost her entire bow. After makeshift repairs, Toumbas led the ship back to Egypt, arriving at Alexandria on 6 December. In April 1944, he took part in the violent suppression of the pro-leftist Navy mutiny, leading one of the boarding detachments.

Following the liberation of Greece in October 1944, he served as chief of staff of the Fleet and CO of the Destroyer Squadron, until he assumed command of the Salamis Naval Base in 1945. In 1946 he was appointed as chief of the Coastal Forces Command, and in 1947 he was sent to Washington, D.C., as a naval attaché. Promoted to Rear Admiral in 1950, he assumed the post of chief of the Aegean Naval Command, and served as Chief of the Fleet Command in 1952–1953. He resigned in 1953, retiring as a vice admiral.

Political career 
Toumbas became involved in politics in 1955, initially with the Liberal Democratic Union of Sofoklis Venizelos, and subsequently with the Liberal Party and the Centre Union of Georgios Papandreou, whose close associate he became. He was elected a member of the Greek Parliament in all elections from 1956 to 1964 (in 1956 with the LDU). He was named Minister without Portfolio in Papandreou's first cabinet in winter 1963, and Minister for the Interior in his second cabinet, from February 1964 to January 1965, when he resigned.

An honest, but politically rather naive and deeply conservative man, he joined all three palace-appointed cabinets during the "Apostasy" crisis of 1965–1966. He served as Interior and Public Order Minister under Georgios Athanasiadis-Novas, Minister for Public Works in the Ilias Tsirimokos cabinet, a post he initially kept in the Stefanos Stefanopoulos government, before moving to the ministries of Industry and Northern Greece, finally becoming Foreign Minister in 1966.

He was politically inactive during the Greek military junta of 1967–1974, and after its fall he joined the right-wing New Democracy party, with which he was elected on the nationwide list in the 1974 elections. In 1979 he became a member of the Academy of Athens, and served as its president in 1991. He died in Athens on 7 May 1995.

Writings 
 Εχθρός εν όψει [Enemy in Sight], Athens 1954. Won the Academy of Athens prize.
 Από το ημερολόγιο ενός υπουργού [From the diary of a minister], Athens 1986.

References 

1901 births
1995 deaths
People from Mykonos
Liberal Democratic Union (Greece) politicians
Liberal Party (Greece) politicians
Centre Union politicians
Apostasia of 1965
New Democracy (Greece) politicians
Foreign ministers of Greece
Ministers of the Interior of Greece
Greek MPs 1956–1958
Greek MPs 1958–1961
Greek MPs 1961–1963
Greek MPs 1963–1964
Greek MPs 1974–1977
Hellenic Navy admirals
Greek military personnel of World War II
Members of the Academy of Athens (modern)
Greek naval attachés